{{Speciesbox
| image = Eudonia microphthalma male.jpg
| image_caption = Male
| image2 = Eudonia microphthalma female.jpg
| image2_caption = Female
| taxon = Eudonia microphthalma| authority = (Meyrick, 1885)
| synonyms = 

| synonyms_ref = 
}}Eudonia microphthalma'' is a moth in the family Crambidae. It was described by Edward Meyrick in 1884. It is endemic to New Zealand.

The wingspan is 15–16 mm. The forewings are blackish, irrorated with white. There is a small ochreous-yellow spot near the base, followed by a faint whitish transverse line. Both the first and second line are whitish, margined by dark. The hindwings are fuscous-grey, becoming darker posteriorly. Adults have been recorded on wing in December.

References

Moths described in 1885
Eudonia
Moths of New Zealand
Endemic fauna of New Zealand
Taxa named by Edward Meyrick
Endemic moths of New Zealand